Pefkochori (Pefkochóri , meaning "pine village"; before 1965: Kapsochora (Καψοχώρα, Kapsochóra)) is a tourist town located in the southeast of the peninsula of Kassandra, Chalkidiki, Greece.  Pefkochori is named after the pine trees which are abundant in the mountains of the area. The population in 2011 was 1,931 for the town and 1,962 for the community, which includes the villages Lefkes and Panorama. Its elevation is 10 m. Pefkochori is situated on the northeastern coast of the peninsula, 3 km southeast of Chaniotis, 4 km north of Agia Paraskevi and 92 km southeast of Thessaloniki.

Population

External links
KTEL Bus service routes to/from Pefkochori

See also
List of settlements in Chalkidiki

References

External links

Populated places in Chalkidiki